Pouteria capacifolia is a species of plant in the family Sapotaceae. It is endemic to Ecuador.

References

Flora of Ecuador
capacifolia
Critically endangered plants
Taxonomy articles created by Polbot